Alvena is a village in the Canadian province of Saskatchewan within the Rural Municipality of Fish Creek No. 402 and Census Division No. 15. It is approximately 60 km northeast of Saskatoon.

History

Many early settlers to Alvena were of Ukrainian descent. Many were peasant serf farmers in the Austro-Hungarian Empire. Others were from Poland and they erected Roman Catholic Churches in the area. Earlier settlers along the South Saskatchewan River were Métis.  Many of these families were involved in the April 24, 1885 Battle of Fish Creek which occurred in Tourond's Coulee, a few miles west of what later became Alvena. Alvena incorporated as a village on July 1, 1936.

Demographics 

Notable people 
Edward Bayda – former Chief Justice of Saskatchewan
Ed Tchorzewski - former Saskatchewan Minister of Finance, and President of the New Democratic Party

See also

 List of communities in Saskatchewan
 List of villages in Saskatchewan

References 

Villages in Saskatchewan
Fish Creek No. 402, Saskatchewan
Division No. 15, Saskatchewan